This is a list of hospitals in Spain.

Andalusia

Cádiz 
 Hospital La Línea de la Concepción, La Línea de la Concepción
 Hospital Naval de San Carlos (Military)
 Hospital of Jerez de la Frontera, Jerez de la Frontera
 Hospital of Puerto Real
 Hospital Puerta del Mar, Cádiz
 Hospital Punta de Europa, Algeciras
 Hospital Santa María del Puerto, El Puerto de Santa María

Córdoba 
Hospital Cruz Roja Córdoba
Hospital de Montilla, Montilla
Hospital de Puente Genil, Puente Genil
Hospital Infanta Margarita, Cabra
Hospital La Arruzafa
Hospital San Juan de Dios de Córdoba
Hospital Universitario Reina Sofia:
Hospital General
Hospital Los Morales
Hospital Materno-Infantil
Hospital Provincial
Hospital Valle de los Pedroches, Pozoblanco
Hospital Valle del Guadiato, Peñarroya-Pueblonuevo

Jaén 
Hospital Alto Guadalquivir, Andújar
Hospital Doctor Sagaz
Hospital General San Agustín, Linares
Hospital San Juan de la Cruz, Úbeda
Hospital Universitario Neurotraumatológico
Hospital Universitario Princesa de España

Málaga 
C.P.E., Marbella
Hospital Axarquía, Vélez-Málaga
Hospital Carlos Haya, Málaga
Hospital Costa Del Sol, Marbella
Hospital De Alta Resolución De Benalmádena, Benalmádena
Hospital De Antequera, Antequera
Hospital Marbella USP, Marbella
Hospital Marítimo, Torremolinos
Hospital Materno-Infantil, Málaga
Hospital Serranía, Ronda
Hospital Virgen De La Victoria (Clínico) Málaga

Seville 
Hospital de la Caridad
Hospital El Tomillar international
Hospital Provincial de San Lazaro
Hospital Provincial de San Lázaro
Hospital San Juan de Dios
Hospital Universitario Virgen de Valme
Hospital Universitario Virgen del Rocío
Hospital Universitario Virgen Macarena
Hospital Victoria Eugenia aka de la Cruz Roja

Granada 
 San Juan de Dios Hospital (Granada)

Aragon

Saragossa 
Hospital Clínico Universitario Lozano Blesa
Hospital Quirón Zaragoza
Hospital Real y General de Nuestra Señora de Gracia
Hospital Royo Villanova
Hospital Universitario Miguel Servet de Zaragoza

Principality of Asturias 
Hopital Central Universitario de Asturias
Hospital Comarcal de Jarrio
Hospital de Cabueñes - Gijon
Hospital de Jove
Hospital de San Agustin de Aviles
Hospital del Oriente de Asturias
Hospital Valle del Nalón

Balearic Islands 
Fundación Hospital de Manacor -ManacorMallorca
Hospital Can Misses -Ibiza
Hospital Comarcal de Inca -Inca Mallorca
Hospital de Formentera-Formentera
Hospital Mateu Orfila -Mahón Menorca
Hospital Son Llatzer -Palma de Mallorca
Hospital Universitari Son Espases- Palma de Mallorca

Basque Country 
Hospital Alto Deba - Debagoiena Ospitalea - Zumarraga
Hospital Bidasoa Ospitalea - Irun
Hospital de Basurto - Basurtuko Ospitalea - Bilbao
Hospital de Cruces - Gurutzetako Ospitalea - Barakaldo
Hospital de Leza - Lezako Ospitalea - Leza
Hospital Donostia Ospitalea - Donostia-San Sebastián
Hospital Galdakao Ospitalea - Galdakao
Hospital Gorliz Ospitalea - Gorliz
Hospital Mendaro Ospitalea - Mendaro
Hospital Quirón Bizkaia (Private) - Biscay
Hospital San Eloy Ospitalea - Barakaldo
Hospital Santa Marina Ospitalea - Bilbao
Hospital Universitario Araba - Arabako Ospitale Unibertsitarioa - Vitoria-Gasteiz
Hospital Urduliz Ospitalea - Urduliz

Canary Islands 

Hospital del Norte de Tenerife - Tenerife
Hospital del Sur de Tenerife - Tenerife
Hospital General de Fuerteventura - Fuerteventura
Hospital General de La Palma - La Palma
Hospital General de Lanzarote Dr. José Molina Orosa - Lanzarote
Hospital Nuestra Señora de Guadalupe - La Gomera
Hospital Nuestra Señora de los Reyes - El Hierro
Hospital Universitario de Canarias - Tenerife
Hospital Universitario de Gran Canaria Doctor Negrín - Gran Canaria
Hospital Universitario Insular de Gran Canaria - Gran Canaria
Hospital Universitario Nuestra Señora de Candelaria - Tenerife

Cantabria 
 Centro Hospitalario Padre Menni - Santander
 Hospital Comarcal de Laredo - Laredo
 Hospital Santa Clotilde - Santander
 Hospital Sierrallana- Torrelavega
 Marqués de Valdecilla University Hospital, Santander

Castile-La Mancha 
Hospital de Albacete - Albacete
Hospital General "La Mancha Centro" de Alcázar de San Juan - Ciudad Real
Hospital General de Ciudad Real - Ciudad Real
Hospital Universitario de Toledo - Toledo
Hospital Virgen de la Luz - Cuenca
Hospital Virgen de la Salud - Toledo

Castile and León 
Hospital Universitario de León -  León
Nuevo Hospital de Burgos - Burgos

Catalonia

Tarragona 
Hospital Joan XXIII - Tarragona
Hospital San Joan de Reus - Reus, Tarragona
Hospital Santa Tecla - Tarragona
Pius Hospital de Valls- Valls, Tarragona

Barcelona 
Consorci Sanitari del Maresme - Mataró
Hospital Clínic de Barcelona - Barcelona
Hospital de Barcelona - Barcelona
Hospital de Bellvitge - l'Hospitalet de Llobregat, Barcelona
Hospital de la Vall d'Hebron - Barcelona
 Hospital de Sabadell (Corporació Parc Taulí) - Sabadell
 Hospital de Sant Pau (until June 2009)
Hospital de Terrassa - Terrassa
Hospital del Mar- Barcelona
Hospital Plató - Barcelona
Hospital Quirón Barcelona - Barcelona
Hospital Sant Joan de Déu Barcelona - Esplugues de Llobregat, Barcelona
Hospital Universitari General de Catalunya - Sant Cugat del Vallès

Girona 
Clínica Girona Nephrology and Dialysis Service  - Girona
Josep Trueta University Hospital

Lleida 
Hospital Universitari Arnau de Vilanova - Lleida

Extremadura 
 Hospital de la Siberia
 Hospital Infanta Cristina de Badajoz
 Hospital la ruego
 Hospital San Pedro de Alcántara
 Hospital Universitario de Badajoz
 Hospital Universitario de Cáceres
 Hospital virgen Guadalupe

Galicia

A Coruña 
Complexo Hospitalario Arquitecto Marcide - Professor Novoa Santos - Naval. Xerencia da Área de Ferrol - Ferrol
Complexo Hospitalario Universitario de A Coruña  - A Coruña
Complexo Hospitalario Universitario de Santiago  - Santiago de Compostela
Fundación Pública Hospital da Barbanza - Santa Mariña de Ribeira
Fundación Pública Hospital Virxe da Xunqueira - Cee, Galicia

Lugo 
Complexo Hospitalario Xeral-Calde - Lugo
Hospital Comarcal de Monforte - Monforte de Lemos
Hospital da Costa - Burela

Pontevedra 
Montecelo Hospital
Quirón Miguel Domínguez Hospital (Pontevedra)
Pontevedra Provincial Hospital
University Hospital Complex of Pontevedra - Pontevedra
University Hospital Complex Of Vigo - Vigo
Fundación Pública Hospital do Salnés - Vilagarcía de Arousa

Ourense 
Complexo Hospitalario de Ourense - Ourense
Fundación Hospital Verín - Verín
Hospital Comarcal de Valdeorras - Valdeorras

La Rioja 
Hospital San Pedro - Logroño

Community of Madrid 
Alcorcón
 Hospital Universitario Fundación Alcorcón
Coslada
 Hospital Universitario del Henares
Madrid
 Clínica Moncloa
 Hospital Carlos III 
 Hospital Central de la Defensa (Military)
 Hospital Clínico San Carlos
 Hospital Dam
 Hospital General Universitario Gregorio Marañón
 Hospital Infantil Universitario Niño Jesús
 Hospital Universitario 12 de Octubre
 Hospital Universitario de la Princesa
 Hospital Universitario Infanta Leonor
 Hospital Universitario La Paz
 Hospital Universitario Ramón y Cajal

Majadahonda
Hospital Puerta del Hierro

Móstoles
 Hospital de Móstoles
 Hospital Universitario Rey Juan Carlos
Pozuelo de Alarcón
 Hospital Universitario Quirónsalud Madrid

Region of Murcia 
 Centro Médico Virgen de la Caridad - Cartagena
 Clínica Nuestra Señora de Belén - Murcia
 Hospital Comarcal del Noroeste - Caravaca de la Cruz
 Hospital de la Vega Lorenzo Guirao - Cieza
 Hospital General Universitario Santa Lucía  - Cartagena
 Hospital HLA La Vega - Murcia
 Hospital Los Arcos - San Javier, Murcia
 Hospital Mesa del Castillo - Murcia
 Hospital Naval - Cartagena
 Hospital Perpetuo Socorro - Cartagena
 Hospital QuirónSalud - Murcia
 Hospital Rafael Méndez - Lorca
 Hospital Universitario Morales Meseguer - Murcia
 Hospital Universitario Reina Sofía- Murcia
 Hospital Universitario Santa María del Rosell - Cartagena
 Hospital Universitario Virgen de la Arrixaca - Murcia
 Hospital Virgen del Castillo - Yecla
 Santo y Real Hospital de Caridad - Cartagena

Foral Community of Navarre 
Clinica Universitaria de Navarra Link - Pamplona

Valencian Community

Valencia 
Casa de la salud - Valencia
Clinica Quirón - Valencia
Hospital 9 d'Octubre - Valencia
Hospital Arnau de Vilanova - Valencia
Hospital Clínic Universitari - Valencia
Hospital de La Ribera - Alzira
Hospital de Lliria - Lliria
Hospital de Manises - Manises
Hospital Francesc de Borja - Gandia
Hospital General de Requena - Requena
Hospital General Universitari - Valencia
Hospital la Malva-Rosa - Valencia
Hospital Lluis Alcanyís - Xàtiva
Hospital Militar Vazquez Bernabeu - Valencia
Hospital Nisa València al Mar - Valencia
Hospital Universitari La Fe - Valencia
Hospital Universitario Doctor Peset - Valencia
Hospital Virgen del Consuelo - Valencia

Castellón 
Hospital Auxiliar de Segorbe - Segorbe
Hospital Comarcal de Vinaròs - Vinaròs
Hospital de Sagunto - Sagunto
Hospital General Universitario de Castellón - Castellón de la Plana
Hospital Provincial de Castellón - Castellón de la Plana
Hospital Universitario de La Plana - Villareal

Alicante/Alacant 
Hospital General de Alicante - Alicante
Hospital General de Dénia (Marina Salud) - Dénia
Hospital General de Elche - Elche
Hospital General de Elda - Elda
Hospital General de Ontinyent - Ontinyent
Hospital General Plá - Alicante
Hospital Marina Baixa - Benidorm
Hospital Público Virgen de Los Lirios - Alcoy
Hospital Universitario de Torrevieja - Torrevieja
Hospital Universitario del Vinalopó - Elche
Hospital Universitario San Juan - San Juan de Alicante
Hospital Universitario San Juan de Alicante - Alicante

Autonomous regions

Ceuta

Melilla
 Hospital Comarcal de Melilla
 Hospital de la Cruz Roja
 Hospital del Rey

References 

Spain

Hospitals
Spain